Kheyrabad-e Sharqi (also Romanized as Kheyrābād-e Sharqī; also known as Kheyrābād and Āb Dīvāneh) is a village in Dughayi Rural District, in the Central District of Quchan County, Razavi Khorasan Province, Iran. At the 2006 census, its population was 40, in 11 families.

References 

Populated places in Quchan County